is a 1997 Japanese psychological thriller film written and directed by Kiyoshi Kurosawa, starring Kōji Yakusho, Masato Hagiwara, Tsuyoshi Ujiki and Anna Nakagawa. The story follows a detective investigating a string of gruesome murders where an X is carved into the neck of each victim, and the murderer is found near the victim of each case and remembers nothing of the crime. It is considered a progenitor of the explosion of Japanese horror media in the late 1990s and early 2000s, preceding other releases like Hideo Nakata's Ring and Takashi Shimizu's Ju-On: The Grudge.

The film was released to strong critical acclaim in Japan and internationally, with critics praising Kurosawa's direction as well as the visuals and atmosphere. In 2012, South Korean film director Bong Joon-ho listed the film as one of the greatest films of all time, citing it as having had a strong impact on his career. This is Kurosawa and lead actor Yakusho's first collaboration.

Plot
Kenichi Takabe is a police detective with a mentally unstable wife. Takabe investigates a series of bizarre murders in which each victim is killed in the same way, with a large "X" carved into their neck, but the perpetrator is different each time. In every case the murderers are caught close to the scene of the crime, and although they readily confess to committing the crimes, they never have a substantial motive and cannot explain what drove them to kill.

Takabe, together with a psychologist named Sakuma, eventually determines that one man is the common thread among the murders, as each person he comes in contact with commits a killing shortly thereafter. The man, called Mamiya, appears to have extreme short-term memory loss; he seems constantly confused about what day it is, where he is, and what his name is. He claims to recall nothing of his past. Mamiya constantly counters Takabe's interrogation with evasive questions regarding Takabe's identity. This drives Takabe nearly insane as he gradually loses his initial calmness. The futility of the case starts to affect his psyche as he becomes more and more volatile, exploding into violent fits of anger.

Takabe discovers that Mamiya used to be a student of psychology who researched mesmerism and hypnosis. He comes to realize that Mamiya has no memory problems, and is instead a master of hypnosis, capable of planting criminal suggestions in strangers' minds by exposing them to repetitive sounds, the motion of water, or the flame of a lighter.

In an archive, Sakuma finds a videotape of a mysterious man, speculated to be the originator of Japanese mesmerism, and shows it to Takabe. The man is depicted hypnotizing a woman in the late 1800s. She had been under treatment for hysteria and was hypnotized by the man who gestured an "X" midair. The woman later killed her son in a manner similar to Mamiya's crimes. Sakuma believes the current crimes have a connection to the earlier events, describing Mamiya as a missionary of ceremonial murders. After showing the tape, Sakuma is revealed to have unconsciously drawn an X on his wall, and starts to experience hallucinations of Takabe menacingly cornering him. Several days later, the police discover Sakuma's body in his home, and conclude that he committed suicide. Meanwhile, Mamiya is jailed and charged with incitement to murder.

Mamiya finds Takabe fascinating, possibly because he cannot force him to kill. Takabe is tormented by visions of his wife dead, however, and the more he studies Mamiya, the more he feels that he might be losing his mind. The detective grows frustrated with his wife's helplessness and even expresses murderous intent towards her at one point. His wife's strange behavior and concerns about his own mental stability lead him to have her committed to a mental hospital.

When Mamiya escapes, killing a policeman and a doctor in the process, Takabe tracks him to a deserted building in the wilderness and shoots him, but not before Mamiya, moments before dying, draws an X in the air with his finger in front of Takabe. Exploring the building, Takabe finds and listens to an old phonograph cylinder that contains a scratchy recording of a male voice repeating what seem to be cryptic hypnotic instructions.

The next scene cuts to the mental hospital where Takabe has had his wife committed. A nurse hears a squeaking sound behind her and turns to see Takabe’s wife’s lifeless body in a wheelchair with an “X” carved into her neck.

The film ends ambiguously at a restaurant where a waitress serves Takabe, then suddenly draws out a knife after speaking to the detective — suggesting that the phonograph’s hypnotic power continues to spread.

Cast
 Kōji Yakusho as Takabe
 Masato Hagiwara as Mamiya
 Tsuyoshi Ujiki as Sakuma
 Anna Nakagawa as Takabe's wife
 Yoriko Dōguchi as Dr. Akiko Miyajima
 Yukijirō Hotaru as Ichiro Kuwano
 Denden as Oida
 Ren Osugi as Fujiwara
 Masahiro Toda as Tōru Hanaoka
Misayo Haruki as Tomoko Hanaoka
Shun Nakayam as Kimura
Akira Otaka as Yasukawa
Shôgo Suzuki as Tamura
Touji Kawahigashi as Psychiatrist
Hajime Tanimoto as Takabe no shachô

Release
Cure was released in 1997. It was later screened at the Toronto International Film Festival in 1999 as part of a career retrospective on Kurosawa. It received a wider release in the West in 2001. The film was released on home video for the first time in the UK as part of The Masters of Cinema Series on April 23, 2018.

Reception
On the review aggregator website Rotten Tomatoes, Cure has a 93% approval rating based on 51 reviews, with an average score of 7.34/10. The site's critical consensus reads: "Mesmerizing and psychologically intriguing." Tom Mes of Midnight Eye described the film as "a horror film in the purest sense of the word". Meanwhile, A. O. Scott of The New York Times noted that Kiyoshi Kurosawa "turns the thriller into a vehicle for gloomy social criticism." Scott Tobias of The A.V. Club said: "Kurosawa, a prolific genre stylist who specializes in low-key thrillers and horror films, undercuts the lurid material by keeping a chilly, almost clinical distance from the events and unfolding the story in elliptical pieces." For Screen Slate, Stephanie Monohan wrote, "Arguably overshadowed by other films in the turn-of-the-century J-Horror canon like Ringu (1998) and Audition (1999), Cure lives on as one of the more powerful works of the era."

Kurosawa, speaking about the success of Cure, stated, "I watched a lot of American horror movies growing up, and I had wanted to make a movie in that genre for some years. Then the growth in popularity of genre films made it easier for me to get the project financed and produced. So, circumstance was the key factor to the success of Cure, and it has continued to play an important role in my career ever since."

References

Footnotes

Sources

External links
 
 
 

1997 films
1997 crime thriller films
1997 horror films
1990s Japanese-language films
1990s psychological thriller films
Japanese horror films
Japanese crime thriller films
Films directed by Kiyoshi Kurosawa
Japanese neo-noir films
Police detective films
Japanese serial killer films
Japanese police films
1990s Japanese films